The 1909–10 season was Manchester City F.C.'s nineteenth season of league football and first season back in the second rung of English football following their relegation the previous season. As in the 1902–03 season, City rebounded instantly with a promotion in their first year back in the Second Division. Winning the division gave the club a third Second Division trophy win - something only Liverpool had achieved at this point. From 1910 to this day, no club has even for one season ever surpassed City's haul of second tier trophies, which currently stands at seven.

Team Kit

Football League Second Division

Results summary

Reports

FA Cup

Squad statistics

Squad
Appearances for competitive matches only

Scorers

All

League

FA Cup

See also
Manchester City F.C. seasons

References

External links
Extensive Manchester City statistics site

1909-10
English football clubs 1909–10 season